The Government Legal Department (previously called the Treasury Solicitor's Department) is the largest in-house legal organisation in the United Kingdom's Government Legal Service.

The department is headed by the Treasury Solicitor. This office goes back several centuries. The office was enshrined in law by the Treasury Solicitor Act 1876, which established the Treasury Solicitor as a corporation sole (an office with perpetual succession). Employees of the department exercise legal powers which are vested in the corporation sole.

The department is a non-ministerial government department and executive agency. The Treasury Solicitor reports to the Attorney General for England and Wales. The department employs more than 1,900 solicitors and barristers to provide advice and legal representation on a huge range of issues to many government departments.

History
The department was historically known as the Treasury Solicitor's Department, but changed name to the Government Legal Department on 1 April 2015. The new name reflects a "significant period of change", which saw the department double in size to 2,000 staff.

The head of the department combines the ancient office of King's Proctor with that of Treasury Solicitor. She has the formal title of His Majesty's Procurator General and Treasury Solicitor. The office is currently held by Susanna McGibbon who succeeded Sir Jonathan Jones after his resignation on 8 September 2020. She is also the Chief Executive of the department as an executive agency.

Functions
Government Legal Department lawyers work in both advisory and litigation roles. In litigation, lawyers bring and defend legal proceedings involving central government and related bodies. In advisory teams, lawyers provide advice to ministers and civil servants on both the current law and on proposed Government policies and future legislation.

The department is the authorised address for service of proceedings on most government departments, by virtue of the list published under the Crown Proceedings Act 1947.

In England (with the exception of Lancashire, Manchester and Cornwall, where the function is delegated to Farrer & Co), the Treasury Solicitor is the Crown's nominee for the collection and disposition of ownerless property (bona vacantia). This typically comprises the assets of dissolved companies and the estates of persons who die intestate and with no known kin.

List of HM Procurators-General and Treasury Solicitors

King's Proctor/Procurators General 
The office of King's (or Queen's) Proctor is ancient; it also came to be known as HM Procurator General. The following were King's or Queen's Proctor after 1660:

 1660–1669: Alexander Cheeke
1669–1700: Samuel Franklyn
1700–1710: Thomas Smith
1710–1714: George Smith
1714–1727: Henry Farrant
1727–1750: Edward Greenly
1750–1766: Thomas Tindal
1766–1783: Philip Champion de Crespigny
1783–1804: James Heseltine
1804–1815: Charles Bishop
1815–1844: Iltid Nicholl
1845–1876: Francis Hart Dyke

Treasury Solicitor 
Historically, there were two solicitors in the Treasury. The first (The Solicitor for Negotiating and Looking after the Affairs of the Treasury), which existed alone until 1696, had become a sinecure by 1744, and perhaps as early as 1716; from the late 18th century the office included a salary of £200 a year. It was abolished in 1800. A second Treasury Solicitor, the precursor of the modern office, was established in 1696 and was assigned all the legal business undertaken in Westminster Hall; as the first Solicitor became a sinecure, the second Solicitor became the only one responsible for legal business. By 1786, its office-holder was carrying out legal work for other secretaries of state and the Attorney-General, and in the early nineteenth century was employed by other government departments as well. From 1794, the Solicitor was also barred from running their own private practice. The salary began at £500, increased to £1,000 in 1755 and then to £2,000 in 1794; until the 1830s, the Solicitor also charged fees for work done in departments outside the Treasury, but these were then abolished and he received an allowance of £850 in addition to his salary. The whole salary was fixed at £2,000 in 1851, and then increased to £2,500 in 1872. The following were Treasury Solicitors after 1660.

Treasury Solicitor (I; a sinecure by 1744 and abolished in 1800) 

 By 1661: John Rushworth
 By 1673: Sir William Turner
 1676–1679: John Ramsey
 1679–1685: Thomas Lloyd
 1685–1689: Philip Burton
 1689–1696: Aaron Smith
 1696–1716: Henry Baker
 1716–1728: Philip Horneck
 1728–1729: Edward Roome
 1729–1737: Charles Valence Jones
 1737–1744: Charlton Hayward
 1744–1800: Hugh Valence Jones

Treasury Solicitor (II; from 1696) 

 1696–1700: Nicholas Baker
 1700–1715: William Borrett
 1715–1730: Anthony Cracherode
 1730–1742: Nicholas Paxton
 1742–1756: John Sharpe
 1756–1765: Philip Carteret Webb
 1765–1775: Thomas Nuthall
 1775–1794: William Chamberlayne
 1794–1806: Joseph White
 1806–1818: Henry Charles Litchfield
 1818–1851: George Maule
 1851–1866: Henry Revell Reynolds
 1866–1871: John Greenwood
 1871–1875: John Gray
 1875–1894: Augustus Keppel Stephenson

Procurators General and Treasury Solicitor 
In 1876, Augustus Keppel Stephenson, the Treasury Solicitor, was appointed Queen's Proctor and Procurator General; since then, the offices of Procurator General and Treasury Solicitor have been held together. By 1971, the office came with a salary of £14,000 a year. The following have been jointly HM Procurator General and Treasury Solicitor:
1876–1894: Sir Augustus Keppel Stephenson, KCB
1894–1909: Hamilton Cuffe, 5th Earl of Desart, KP, KCB, PC
1909–1923: Sir John Paget Mellor, 1st Baronet, KCB
 1923–1926: Hon. Alfred Clive Lawrence, CBE
 1926–1933: Sir Maurice Linford Gwyer, GCB, KCB, KCSI, QC
 1934–1953: Sir Thomas James Barnes, GCB, Kt, CBE
 1953–1964: Sir Harold Simcox Kent, GCB, QC
 1964–1971: Sir William Arthur Harvey Druitt, KCB
 1971–1975: Sir Henry Gabriel Ware, KCB
 1975–1980: Sir Basil Brodribb Hall, KCB, MC, TD
 1980–1984: Sir Michael James Kerry, KCB, QC
 1984–1988: Sir John Bilsland Bailey, KCB
 1988–1992: Sir James Nursaw, KCB, QC
 1992–1995: Sir Gerald Albery Hosker, KCB, QC
 1995–1996: Michael Lawrence Saunders, CB
 1997–2000: Sir Anthony Hilgrove Hammond, KCB QC (Hon)
 2000–2006: Dame Juliet Louise Wheldon, DCB QC
 2006–2014: Sir Paul Christopher Jenkins, KCB, QC (Hon)
 2014–2020: Sir Jonathan Guy Jones, KCB, QC (Hon)
 2021–present: Susanna McGibbon

See also
Departments of the United Kingdom Government

References

External links
 
 Government Legal Department
 Bona Vacantia

Law of the United Kingdom
Executive agencies of the United Kingdom government
1876 establishments in the United Kingdom
Organizations established in 1876